Homens da Luta (Men of the Struggle) is a Portuguese improvisational comedy and musical street performance group consisting of brothers Vasco Duarte (Falâncio) and Nuno Duarte "Jel" (Neto). Their songs are a parody of songs sung during the period after the 1974 Carnation Revolution, and the characters played are caricatures of the revolutionary singers of the time, such as Zeca Afonso and José Mário Branco. Homens da Luta often use the term "struggle" to invoke slogans that became famous during the revolutionary era, such as "A Luta Continua" (The Struggle Goes On).
In 2010 Homens da Luta released an mp3 album called "A Canção é uma arma"  (The song is a weapon) consisting of 14 songs. One of their most popular songs is "E o povo, pá?" (What about the people, man?).

Eurovision Song Contest 
In 2010, Homens da Luta took part in the RTP Song Festival 2010, with the song "Luta assim não dá" (The struggle can't go on like this). The song was disqualified as it had been previously performed, which was a breach of the rules of the Festival and the international ESC.

In 2011, they entered the contest again with the song "A luta é alegria" (The struggle is joy), lyrics by Nuno Duarte "Jel" and composed by Vasco Duarte. They were in sixth place until the public vote was counted, at which point they ended up on the first place, winning a place in Düsseldorf. They represented Portugal at the Eurovision Song Contest 2011 in Düsseldorf, Germany, but did not gain enough votes from other countries for a place in the final round. Since the group are comedians and not singers, and because their victory was also based on popular support rather than the selected jury, there were some negative reactions to their win on the site of the contest.

References

Portuguese musical groups
Eurovision Song Contest entrants for Portugal
Eurovision Song Contest entrants of 2011